"neither" is a very short story by Samuel Beckett written in 1976 and originally published in the Journal of Beckett Studies No. 4 (Spring 1979). The title is uncapitalized, and the story is composed of only eighty-seven words, divided into ten lines, and has no punctuation except for three commas.

Though originally published with line breaks suggestive of a poem, Beckett refused to include the piece in his Collected Poems because he considered it a story. As a result, the work was omitted from the 1984 collection The Collected Shorter Prose 1945-1980 but later restored in The Complete Short Prose 1929-1989.

Short stories by Samuel Beckett